Rodney Gordon Gardner (born 1948) is a former political figure in Saskatchewan. He represented Pelly in the Legislative Assembly of Saskatchewan from 1986 to 1991 as a Progressive Conservative.
He later served as Mayor for Kamsack, Saskatchewan.

References 

Progressive Conservative Party of Saskatchewan MLAs
Living people
1948 births